Sericanthe toupetou is a species of plant in the family Rubiaceae. It is found in Ivory Coast and Ghana. It is threatened by habitat loss.

References

Sericanthe
Endangered plants
Taxonomy articles created by Polbot
Taxa named by André Aubréville
Taxa named by François Pellegrin